FALM may refer to:
 Air Force Base Makhado
 Free Access to Law Movement